The Wolseley Wasp was a light saloon car produced by Wolseley Motors Limited in 1935 and 1936. It was an updated version of the Wolseley Nine model with a larger engine and steel disc wheels.

The overhead cam shaft engine had 12 volt electrics and drove the rear wheels via a four speed gearbox. Hydraulic brakes were fitted.

In all, 5,815 cars were made.

References

External links

Wasp
Cars introduced in 1935